Dina Shihabi (born September 21, 1989) is a Saudi Arabian actress working in the United States.

Early life and education
Shihabi was born in Riyadh, Saudi Arabia, and was raised in Saudi Arabia, Beirut, and Dubai. Her family is of Arab and European origin. She described her multi-ethnic background as such: "I consider myself Arab European because my father Ali Shihabi is half-Saudi, half-Norwegian, and my mom Nadia is half-Palestinian, half-German and Haitian, but raised in France." She stated that she enjoyed watching films from an early age. Shihabi's father is a commentator on Saudi politics and former banker. He was the chairman of Saudi Hollandi Bank.

Career
At age 11 she began taking dance lessons from Sharmila Kamte, a renowned dance teacher at the Dubai Community Theatre and Arts Centre Chaloub Studio, known as the "dancing queen" of the United Arab Emirates. She became a member of her modern professional dance team.

In Dubai she attended Al Mawakeb School, Emirates International School, and Dubai American Academy. Shihabi performed in numerous school plays, and was encouraged by her teacher, Nancy Mock, to pursue an acting career.

At age 18, Shihabi moved to New York City in 2007 and began pursuing a career in acting; this became a full-time profession for her in 2010. She attended the American Academy of Dramatic Arts for two years. In 2011, she was accepted at both Juilliard and The graduate Acting Program at NYU Tisch School for the Arts. Although Shihabi did not complete a 4-year bachelor's degree (she attended the American Academy of Dramatic Arts, an Acting Conservatory from 2008 to 2010), NYU waived the requirement of a bachelor's degree, and she graduated with her MFA in 2014. She is the first Middle East-born woman to be accepted to both the Juilliard and NYU Graduate Acting programs, as well as the first Saudi Arabian woman accepted to these institutions.

In February 2019, it was announced that Shihabi was cast in the main role of Dig 301 for the second season of Netflix's science-fiction series, Altered Carbon.

Personal life
Dina enjoys dancing as a hobby.

Shihabi's native Arabic dialect is a form of Levantine Arabic.

Filmography

References

External links

1989 births
Living people
People from Riyadh
Saudi Arabian film actresses
Saudi Arabian people of Palestinian descent
Saudi Arabian people of Norwegian descent
Saudi Arabian people of German descent
Saudi Arabian people of Haitian descent